The men's 110 metres hurdles event at the 2015 Asian Athletics Championships was held on the 3 of June.

Medalists

Results

Heats
First 2 in each heat (Q) and the next 2 fastest (q) qualified for the final.

Wind:Heat 1: -0.8 m/s, Heat 2: -0.8 m/s, Heat 3: -0.1 m/s

Final
Wind: -0.6 m/s

References

110
Sprint hurdles at the Asian Athletics Championships